This is a list of piston engines developed, independently or with other car companies, by Toyota Motor Corporation.

Engine codes
Toyota has produced a wide variety of automobile engines, including four-cylinder and V6 engines. The company follows a naming system for their engines:
 The first numeric characters specify the engine block's model (usually differed by displacement)
 The next one or two letters specify the engine family
 The suffix (separated by a dash) specifies the features of the engine:

Note: Other manufacturers may modify the engine after it has left the Toyota factory but the engine still keeps the original Toyota designation. For example, Lotus added a supercharger to the 2ZZ-GE in some versions of the Lotus Elise and Exige but it is still labelled 2ZZ-GE, not 2ZZ-GZE.

Examples:

 2NR-FE
 2NR – Second model in the NR engine family
 F – Normal cylinder head DOHC
 E – Multi-point fuel injection
 3S-GTE
 3S – Third model in the S engine family
 G – Performance cylinder head DOHC
 T – Turbocharged
 E – Multi-point fuel injection
 2UR-FSE
 2UR – Second model in the UR engine family
 F – Normal cylinder head DOHC
 S – D4-S Gasoline direct injection
 E – Multi-point fuel injection
 3ZR-FAE
 3ZR - Third model in the ZR engine family
 F - Normal cylinder head DOHC
 A - Valvematic variable lift intake head
 E - Multi-point fuel injection
 1KD-FTV
 1KD – First model in the KD engine family
 F – Normal cylinder head DOHC
 T – Turbocharged
 V – D-4D common rail direct injection (diesel)

The use of "G" to denote twin cam engines was decided on in 1971, with the renaming of the 10R into 8R-G. Before that, twin cams had received separate numerical codes.

Note:

 In 1987, Toyota began assigning dual letter engine codes to some of the "engine family" categories in some engine lines, particularly six-cylinder models. This can create potential confusion. E.g. 1MZ-FE – This is not a supercharged, narrow angle, fuel injected M-series engine, but a narrow angle, fuel injected MZ-series engine. Confusion is easiest to avoid when using the dash to separate between the engine series and its own characteristics: for instance, 1MZ-FE rather than 1M-ZFE.
 Starting in 2015, the designations after the dash have a maximum combination of three letters, even though there are more suffixes applicable. This is particular when newer engine technologies are introduced. Case in point, both the 2GR-FKS and 8AR-FTS engines have an electronic multi-point fuel injection, but the "E" suffix is not included in the code.

Dynamic Force engine series

The Dynamic Force engine series introduced in 2017 has a partially different naming scheme. For instance, the two numbers between the first and second letters denotes the displacement of the engine. The rest of the naming scheme (such as the suffix) remains the same as with prior engines.

Examples:

 M20A-FKS
 M20A is a 2.0-liter engine, as denoted by the "20" in "M20A"
 F – Normal cylinder head DOHC
 K – On-demand Atkinson cycle in non-hybrid engines
 S – D4-S Gasoline direct injection
 T24A-FTS
 T24A is a 2.4-liter engine, as denoted by the "24" in "T24A"
 F – Normal cylinder head DOHC
 T – Turbocharged
 S – D4-S Gasoline direct injection

Note:

 Some engines don’t share the same displacement as with the one found in the engine code. The V35A-FTS is a good example of this, where despite the model code designation and marketing materials, the actual displacement of the engine is 3.4-liters, not 3.5.
 There are some engines that used the naming scheme of the Dynamic Force family of engines but are not actually part of them; a good example of this would be the F33A-FTV engine as despite it not belonging to the Dynamic Force family of engines, it still used the naming scheme normally used for the aforementioned engines. This also applies to the G16E-GTS engine as well.

Gasoline

Flat-twin or Flat-four

 1961 – U
 1961–1966 – 0.7 L (697 cc) U
 1965–1975 – 0.8 L (790 cc) 2U
 2012–2021 – 2.0 L (1,998 cc) 4U (by Subaru)

Straight-3
 2004 – KR – DOHC (by Daihatsu)
 2004 – 1.0 L (998 cc) 1KR
 2018 – WZ – DOHC (by Groupe PSA)
 2018 - 1.2 L 2WZ-LV
 2018 - 1.2 L 2WZ-HV
 2019 - M15A – DOHC
 2019 - 1.5 L (1490 cc) M15A
 2020 - G16E – DOHC
 2020 - 1.6 L (1618 cc) G16E-GTS
 2021 – WA – DOHC (by Daihatsu)
 2021 – 1.2 L (1198 cc) WA-VE/WA-VEX

Straight-4

 1939 – Type C – OHV
 1939–1941 – 2.3 L (2259 cc) C
 1947 – Type S – SV
 1947–1959 – 1.0 L (995 cc) S
 1953 – R – OHV/SOHC/DOHC
 1953–1964 – 1.5 L (1453 cc) R
 1964–1969 – 1.5 L (1490 cc) 2R
 1959–1968 – 1.9 L (1897 cc) 3R
 1965–1968 – 1.6 L (1587 cc) 4R
 1968–1986 – 2.0 L (1994 cc) 5R
 1969–1974 – 1.7 L (1707 cc) 6R
 1968–1970 – 1.6 L (1591 cc) 7R
 1968–1972 – 1.9 L (1858 cc) 8R
 1967–1968 – 1.6 L (1587 cc) 9R
 1968–1971 – 1.9 L (1858 cc) 10R
 1969–1988 – 1.6 L (1587 cc) 12R
 1974–1980 – 1.8 L (1808 cc) 16R
 1971–1982 – 2.0 L (1968 cc) 18R
 1975–1977 – 2.0 L (1968 cc) 19R
 1974–1980 – 2.2 L (2189 cc) 20R
 1978–1987 – 2.0 L (1972 cc) 21R
 1980–1995 – 2.4 L (2366 cc) 22R
 1959 – P
 1959–1961 – 1.0 L (997 cc) P
 1961–1972 – 1.2 L (1198 cc) 2P
 1972–1979 – 1.3 L (1345 cc) 3P
 1966 – K – OHV
 1966–1969 – 1.1 L (1077 cc) K
 1969–1988 – 1.0 L (993 cc) 2K
 1969–1979 – 1.2 L (1166 cc) 3K
 1978–1989 – 1.3 L (1290 cc) 4K
 1983–1989 – 1.5 L (1486 cc) 5K
 1998–1998 – 1.8 L (1781 cc) 7K
 1970 – T – OHV/DOHC
 1970–1979 – 1.4 L (1407 cc) T
 1970–1985 – 1.6 L (1588 cc) 2T
 1977–1985 – 1.8 L (1770 cc) 3T
 1970–1983 – 1.6 L (1588 cc) 12T
 1977–1982 – 1.8 L (1770 cc) 13T
 1978 – A – SOHC/DOHC
 1978–1979 – 1.5 L (1452 cc) 1A
 1979–1986 – 1.3 L (1295 cc) 2A
 1979–1988 – 1.5 L (1452 cc) 3A
 1979–1998 – 1.6 L (1587 cc) 4A
 1987–1998 – 1.5 L (1498 cc) 5A
 1989–1992 – 1.4 L (1397 cc) 6A
 1993–1998 – 1.8 L (1762 cc) 7A
 2004–2006 – 1.3 L (1342 cc) 8A
 1982 – S – SOHC/DOHC
 1982–1988 – 1.8 L (1832 cc) 1S
 1982–1987 – 2.0 L (1995 cc) 2S
 1985–2005 – 2.0 L (1998 cc) 3S
 1987–1998 – 1.8 L (1838 cc) 4S
 1990–2001 – 2.2 L (2164 cc) 5S
 1982 – Y – OHV
 1982 – 1.6 L (1626 cc) 1Y
 1982 – 1.8 L (1812 cc) 2Y
 1982–1998 – 2.0 L (1998 cc) 3Y
 1985–1993 – 2.2 L (2237 cc) 4Y
 1985 – E – SOHC/DOHC
 1985–1994 – 1.0 L (999 cc)  1E
 1985–1998 – 1.3 L (1295 cc) 2E
 1986–1994 – 1.5 L (1456 cc) 3E
 1989–1998 – 1.3 L (1331 cc) 4E
 1991–1999 – 1.5 L (1497 cc) 5E
 1990 – TZ – DOHC
 1990–2000 – 2.4 L (2438 cc) 2TZ
 1997 – ZZ – DOHC
 1997–2007 – 1.8 L (1794 cc) 1ZZ
 1999–2006 – 1.8 L (1796 cc) 2ZZ
 2000 – 1.6 L (1598 cc) 3ZZ
 2000 – 1.4 L (1398 cc) 4ZZ
 1989 – RZ – SOHC/DOHC
 1989 – 2.0 L (1998 cc) 1RZ
 1989 – 2.4 L (2400 cc) 2RZ
 1995 – 2.7 L (2693 cc) 3RZ
 1999 – SZ – DOHC (by Daihatsu)
 1999 – 1 L (997 cc) 1SZ
 2001 – 1.3 L (1298 cc) 2SZ
 2006 – 1.5 L (1495 cc) 3SZ
 1997 – NZ – DOHC
 1997 – 1.5 L (1497 cc) 1NZ
 1999 – 1.3 L (1298 cc) 2NZ
 2000 – AZ – DOHC
 2000 – 2.0 L (1998 cc) 1AZ
 2000 – 2.4 L (2362 cc) 2AZ
 2003 – TR – DOHC
 2003 – 2.0 L (1998 cc) 1TR
 2003 – 2.7 L (2694 cc) 2TR
 2007 – ZR – DOHC
 2007 – 1.6 L (1598 cc) 1ZR
 2007 – 1.8 L (1797 cc) 2ZR
 2007 – 2.0 L (1986 cc) 3ZR
 2008 – NR – DOHC
 2008 – 1.33 L (1329 cc) 1NR
 2010 – 1.5 L (1496 cc) 2NR
 2011 – 1.2 L (1197 cc) 3NR
 2013 – 1.3 L (1329 cc) 4NR
 2013 – 1.5 L (1496 cc) 5NR
 2010 – 1.3 L (1329 cc) 6NR
 2010 – 1.5 L (1498 cc) 7NR
 2015 – 1.2 L (1197 cc) 8NR
 2008 – AR – DOHC
 2008 – 2.7 L (2672 cc) 1AR
 2008 – 2.5 L (2494 cc) 2AR
 2014 – 2.0 L (1998 cc) 6AR
 2015 – 2.0 L (1998 cc) 8AR
 2014 – RI - DOHC (Non-production)
 2014 – 2.0 L RI4A
 2017 – 2.0 L RI4AG
 2017 – A25A - DOHC
 2017 – 2.5 L (2487 cc) A25A
 2018 – M20A - DOHC
 2018 – 2.0 L (1987 cc) M20A
 2021 – T24A – DOHC
 2021 – 2.4 L T24A

Straight-6

 1935 – Type A – OHV
 1935–1947 – 3.4 L (3389 cc) A
 1937 – Type B – OHV
 1937–1955 – 3.4 L (3389 cc) B
 1955 – F – OHV
 1955–1975 – 3.9 L (3878 cc) F
 1975–1987 – 4.2 L (4230 cc) 2F
 1985–1992 – 4.0 L (3956 cc) 3F
 1965 – M – SOHC/DOHC
 1965–1985 – 2.0 L (1988 cc) M
 1966–1972 – 2.3 L (2253 cc) 2M
 1966–1971 – 2.0 L (1988 cc) 3M
 1972–1980 – 2.6 L (2563 cc) 4M
 1979–1988 – 2.8 L (2759 cc) 5M
 1984–1987 – 3.0 L (2954 cc) 6M
 1986–1992 – 3.0 L (2954 cc) 7M
 1979 – G – SOHC/DOHC
 1979–2008 – 2.0 L (1988 cc) 1G
 1990 – JZ – DOHC
 1990–2006 – 2.5 L (2491 cc) 1JZ
 1991–2006 – 3.0 L (2997 cc) 2JZ
 1993 – FZ – DOHC
 1993–2007 – 4.5 L (4477 cc) 1FZ

V6

 1987 – VZ – DOHC/SOHC
 1987–1993 – 2.0 L (1992 cc) 1VZ
 1987–1991 – 2.5 L (2496 cc) 2VZ
 1987–1997 – 3.0 L (2958 cc) 3VZ
 1993–1998 – 2.5 L (2496 cc) 4VZ
 1995–2004 – 3.4 L (3378 cc) 5VZ
 1994 – MZ – DOHC
 1994 – 2007 – 3.0 L (2995 cc) 1MZ
 1998 – 2001 – 2.5 L (2496 cc) 2MZ
 2003 – 2010 – 3.3 L (3310 cc) 3MZ
 2002 – GR – DOHC
 2002 – 4.0 L (3955 cc) 1GR
 2006 – 3.5 L (3456 cc) 2GR
 2003 – 3.0 L (2994 cc) 3GR
 2006 – 2.5 L (2499 cc) 4GR
 2005 – 2.5 L (2497 cc) 5GR
 2016 – 2.4 L H8909 - DOHC (Non-production)
 2016–2020 – 2.4 L H8909
 2021 – 3.5 L H8909
 2017 – V35A – DOHC
 2017 – 3.4 L (3444 cc) V35A
 2021 – F33A – DOHC
 2017 – 3.3 L (3345 cc) F33A

V8
 1963 – V – OHV
 1963–1967 – 2.6 L (2,599 cc) V
 1967–1973 – 3.0 L (2,981 cc) 3V
 1973–1983 – 3.4 L (3,376 cc) 4V
 1983–1998 – 4.0 L (3,995 cc) 5V

1988 – R – DOHC (Non-production)
 1988 – 3.2 L (3,200 cc) R32V
 1989–1994 – 3.6 L (3,579 cc) R36V

 1989 – UZ – DOHC
 1989–2002 – 4.0 L (3,969 cc) 1UZ
 1998–2009 – 4.7 L (4,663 cc) 2UZ
 2000–2010 – 4.3 L (4,300 cc) 3UZ

 1996 – RV8 – DOHC (Non-production)
 1996 – 2.65L RV8A
 1997 – 2.65L RV8B
 1998 – 2.65L RV8C
 1999 – 2.65L RV8D
 2000 – 2.65L RV8E
 2002 – 2.65L RV8F
 2003 – 3.5L RV8I
 2003 – 3.0 L
 2006–2008 – 3.0 L RV8J
 2009 – 3.4 L RV8K, RV8KG
 2011 – 3.4 L RV8KLM
 2014 – 3.7 L RV8KLM

2003 – 2005 – Indy V8 – DOHC (Non-production)

2006 – 2009 – Formula One – RVX – DOHC (Non-production)
 2006 – 2.4 L (2,398 cc) RVX–06
 2007 – 2.4 L (2,398 cc) RVX-07 
 2008 – 2.4 L (2,398 cc) RVX-08 
 2009 – 2.4 L (2,398 cc) RVX-09 
2006 – UR – DOHC
 2006 – 4.6 L (4,608 cc) 1UR
 2007 – 5.0 L (4,969 cc) 2UR
 2007–2022 – 5.7 L (5,663 cc) 3UR

V10
 1991 – RV10 – DOHC (Non-production)
1991–1993 – 3.5 L (3,500 cc) RV10
 2001 – 2005 – Formula One – RVX – DOHC (Non-production)
2001 – 3.0 L (2,998 cc) RVX-01
2002 – 3.0 L (2,998 cc) RVX-02
2003 – 3.0 L (2,998 cc) RVX-03
2004 – 3.0 L (2,998 cc) RVX-04
2005 – 3.0 L (2,998 cc) RVX-05
 2010 – LR – DOHC/VVT-i
 2010–2012 – 4.8 L (4,805 cc) 1LR-GUE

V12

 1997 – GZ – DOHC
 1997–2017 – 5.0 L (4,996 cc) 1GZ-FE

Diesel
Starting in 1957 until 1988, Toyota established a separate dealership in Japan dedicated to cars and trucks installed with diesel engines, called Toyota Diesel Store. When the dealership was disbanded, diesel products are now available at all locations, with commercial products exclusive to Toyota Store and Toyopet Store locations.

Straight-4
1964 – J – OHV
 1964–1978 – 2.3 L (2,336 cc) J
 1969–1983 – 2.5 L (2,481 cc) 2J
1974 – B Second gen. – OHV/SOHC
 1972–1988 – 3.0 L (2,977 cc) B
 1977–1982 – 3.2 L (3,168 cc) 2B
 1980–1990 – 3.4 L (3,432 cc) 3B
 1984–1990 – 3.0 L (2,977 cc) 11B
 1984–1990 – 3.4 L (3,432 cc) 13B
 1988–1996 – 3.7 L (3,661 cc) 14B
 1996–2002 – 4.1 L (4,104 cc) 15B
1980 – L – SOHC
 1977–1983 – 2.2 L (2,188 cc) L
 1980–2004 – 2.4 L (2,446 cc) 2L
 1987–2006 – 2.4 L (2,446 cc) 2L-II change rocker arm to direct tappet drive
 1982–2003 – 2.4 L (2,446 cc) 2L-TE
 1991–1997 – 2.8 L (2,779 cc) 3L
 1997–  3.0 L (2,986 cc) 5L
1983 – W – OHV
 1983–1995 – 4.0 L (4,009 cc) 1W
1984 – C Third gen. – SOHC
 1984–1992 – 1.8 L (1,839 cc) 1C
 1984–2000 – 2.0 L (1,974 cc) 2C
 1994–2002 – 2.2 L (2,184 cc) 3C
1986 – N – SOHC
 1986–1999 – 1.4 L (1,453 cc) 1N
1993 – KZ – SOHC
  1993–2004 – 3.0 L (2,982 cc) 1KZ
2000 – WZ – DOHC/SOHC (by Groupe PSA)
 2000–2001 – 1.9 L 1WZ
2005–2010 – 1.4 L 2WZ-TV
2012– 1.6 L 3WZ
2012– 2.0 L 4WZ
2019– 1.5 L 5WZ
2000 – CD – DOHC
  2000–2006 2.0 L (1,995 cc) 1CD-FTV
2001 – ND – SOHC
  2001–2020 – 1.4 L (1,364 cc) 1ND-TV
2001 – KD – DOHC
  2000– 3.0 L (2,982 cc) 1KD-FTV
  2001– 2.5 L (2,494 cc) 2KD-FTV
2005 – AD – DOHC
  2006–2019 – 2.0 L (1,998 cc) 1AD
  2005–2015 – 2.2 L (2,231 cc) 2AD
2013 – WW - DOHC
  2013–2018 – 1.6 L (1,598 cc) 1WW
  2015–2018 – 2.0 L (1,995 cc) 2WW
2015 – GD – DOHC
  2015– 2.8 L (2,755 cc) 1GD-FTV
  2015– 2.4 L (2.393 cc) 2GD-FTV

Straight-5

1989 – PZ – SOHC	
 1990–2001– 3.5 L (3,470 cc) 1PZ

Straight-6

V6
 2021 – F33A – DOHC
 2021 – 3.3 L (3345 cc) F33A-FTV

V8
 2007 – VD – DOHC
 2007–2021 — 4.5 L (4461 cc) 1VD-FTV

References

Toyota has not published an explanation of the codes used for engine features.  Matti Kalalahti derived a list of engine feature codes and published them on his "Engine codes explained" web page in Oct 1999.

External links

 Toyota Twincam Forums Discussion forum on four cylinder Toyota engines
 Toyota engines Matti Kalalahti's list of Toyota engines.
 Toyota engines and gearboxes Similar to Matti Kalalahti's pages but with extensions by Stepho.
 4AGE.net Information on 4AGE and 4AGZE Toyota engines

Toyota
 
Toyota

ja:トヨタのエンジン型式一覧